Kenedy is a city in Karnes County, Texas, United States, named for Mifflin Kenedy, who bought  and wanted to develop a new town that would carry his name. The population was 3,473 at the 2020 census, up from 3,296 at the 2010 census.

History
In the early 1900s many of Kenedy's gunfighter shootings caused the town to be nicknamed "Six Shooter Junction".

During World War II, the Kenedy Allen Detention Camp was located near the outskirts of the town, on a former Civilian Conservation Corps site. Though it later served as a prisoner of war camp, it started as an internment camp for people of German, Italian and Japanese ancestry deported from Latin America, as well as some who were long-term residents of the U.S. The camp opened in April 1942, when the first group of Latin American deportees arrived: 456 Germans, 156 Japanese and 14 Italians. Despite State Department prisoner exchanges, in which German and Japanese Latin Americans were "repatriated" and traded for U.S. citizens in Axis custody, Kenedy's population swelled to 2,007 by October 1943: 1,168 Germans, 705 Japanese, 72 Italians, and 62 "miscellaneous". The 705 of Japanese descent included U.S. civilians. In 1944, the remaining internees were transferred to other facilities, and by September it had been converted to a German POW camp; beginning in July 1945, the camp was also used to house Japanese POWs. The camp was closed at the end of the war, in September 1945.

On December 13, 2000, a group called the Texas Seven escaped from that prison. They would go on a deadly crime spree before being caught.

On July 24, 2019, the Karnes Countywide Newspaper featured a story on a Kenedy house with ties to a world famous San Antonio landmark.  Blueprints by Hugman-Silber Architects were discovered in the cedar closet of the house.  The blueprints were drawn and traced by Robert H.H. Hugman, the acknowledged visionary behind the San Antonio River Walk.

Geography

Kenedy is located in south-central Karnes County at  (28.8143, –97.8496). Texas State Highway 72 (Main Street) passes through the center of Kenedy, leading northeast  to Yorktown and southwest  to Three Rivers.

Demographics

As of the 2020 United States census, there were 3,473 people, 1,231 households, and 786 families residing in the city.

As of the census of 2000, there were 3,487 people, 1,266 households, and 907 families residing in the city. The population density was 1,049.2 people per square mile (405.5/km2). There were 1,550 housing units at an average density of 466.4/sq mi (180.3/km2). The racial makeup of the city was 72.44% White, 3.18% African American, 0.72% Native American, 0.72% Asian, 0.17% Pacific Islander, 20.68% from other races, and 2.09% from two or more races. Hispanic or Latino of any race were 64.90% of the population.

There were 1,266 households, out of which 36.8% had children under the age of 18 living with them, 48.4% were married couples living together, 17.1% had a female householder with no husband present, and 28.3% were non-families. 25.8% of all households were made up of individuals, and 13.2% had someone living alone who was 65 years of age or older. The average household size was 2.67 and the average family size was 3.20.

In the city, the population was spread out, with 29.0% under the age of 18, 9.4% from 18 to 24, 24.3% from 25 to 44, 19.8% from 45 to 64, and 17.5% who were 65 years of age or older. The median age was 36 years. For every 100 females, there were 86.8 males. For every 100 females age 18 and over, there were 83.5 males.

The median income for a household in the city was $24,647, and the median income for a family was $25,152. Males had a median income of $25,779 versus $17,895 for females. The per capita income for the city was $13,929. About 23.4% of families and 25.8% of the population were below the poverty line, including 33.1% of those under age 18 and 11.9% of those age 65 or over.

Education
The city is served by the Kenedy Independent School District.

Notable people

 Carl Baugh, Young-Earth creationist
 Jim Busby, Major League Baseball player
 Blas Elias, musician
 Cliff Gustafson, head coach for 29 seasons of the University of Texas at Austin baseball team
 Mike Whitwell, NFL player

Climate
The climate in this area is characterized by hot, humid summers and generally mild to cool winters.  According to the Köppen Climate Classification system, Kenedy has a humid subtropical climate, abbreviated "Cfa" on climate maps.

References

External links
Official website

Cities in Texas
Cities in Karnes County, Texas